Ab-e Garm (also Romanized as  Āb-e Garm; also known as Āb Garm-e-Lārījān, Āb Garm-e Lārījān-e Pā’īn, Āb Garm-e Pā’īn Lārījān, and Ābgarm Lārījān) is a village in Bala Larijan Rural District, Larijan District, Amol County, Mazandaran Province, Iran. At the 2006 census, its population was 306, in 91 families.

References 

Populated places in Amol County